José Luis "Puma" Rodríguez Bebanz (born 14 March 1997) is a Uruguayan professional footballer who plays as a right-back for Campeonato Brasileiro Série A club Vasco da Gama and the Uruguay national team.

Career

Vasco da Gama
On 4 January 2023, Vasco da Gama signed Rodríguez a three year contract until 31 December 2025.

International career
Rodríguez is a former Uruguayan youth international.

On 21 October 2022, he was named in Uruguay's 55-man preliminary squad for the 2022 FIFA World Cup. Later he made the 26-men cut to the World Cup squad, althought didn't have a single appearance in the competition.

Career statistics

International

Honours
Nacional
Uruguayan Primera División: 2022

Individual
 Uruguayan Primera División Team of the Year: 2022

References

External links
 

1997 births
Living people
Uruguayan footballers
Uruguayan expatriate footballers
Association football defenders
Footballers from Paysandú
Uruguay youth international footballers
Uruguay under-20 international footballers
Uruguayan Primera División players
Argentine Primera División players
Campeonato Brasileiro Série A players
Danubio F.C. players
Racing Club de Avellaneda footballers
Club Atlético Fénix players
Club Nacional de Football players
CR Vasco da Gama players
2022 FIFA World Cup players
Uruguayan expatriate sportspeople in Argentina
Uruguayan expatriate sportspeople in Brazil
Expatriate footballers in Argentina
Expatriate footballers in Brazil